A Balloon Called Moaning is the debut extended play by Welsh indie rock band the Joy Formidable. It was released exclusively in Japan in December 2008, then released with additional tracks in the UK the following month.

Critical reception
The album was reviewed by NME, which rated it 8 out of 10, and by Pitchfork, which rated it 6.7 out of 10.

Track listing

References

2008 debut EPs
The Joy Formidable albums